The Church of St Peter ad Vincula (Spanish: Iglesia de San Pedro ad Vincula) is a church located in Villa de Vallecas district in Madrid (Spain). 

The design of the building is attributed to the well-known architect Juan de Herrera.  It was built towards the end of the sixteenth century and replaced an earlier church on the same site.

Conservation 
It has been protected by the heritage listing Bien de Interés Cultural since 1995.

See also 
Catholic Church in Spain
List of oldest church buildings

References

External links 

Pedro Advincula
Bien de Interés Cultural landmarks in Madrid
16th-century Roman Catholic church buildings in Spain
Buildings and structures in Villa de Vallecas District, Madrid